The I-League 2007–08 kicked off on 24 November 2007 at the Fatorda Stadium, Margao, Goa. The first match of the season was played between the two Goan clubs Dempo and Salgaocar.

The top team in the I-League qualified for the qualifying phase of the 2009 AFC Champions League, while the bottom two teams were relegated to I-League 2nd Division in the next season.

Teams

Standings

I-League Division 1

Results

Top goalscorers

I-League Division 1
Last updated: 23 February 2008
Ref:

Managers

References

External links
I League

 
I-League seasons
1
India